is a former Japanese prince and 24th head of the Fushimi-no-miya shinnōke (collateral branch of the Imperial Family of Japan). He has not been a member of imperial family since the passing of the Imperial Household Law of 1947. If the law had not been changed, he would have been 4th in line to the Japanese throne .

Life
In terms of succession to the Japanese throne, Fushimi Hiroaki is a 16th cousin, thrice removed, of Emperor Naruhito. Their most recent common ancestor in the paternal line was Prince Fushimi Sadafusa (1372–1456), who fathered Naruhito's forefather Emperor Go-Hanazono (1428–1464) and Hiroaki's forefather Prince Fushimi Sadatsune (1426–1474). Despite the great distance, Hiroaki is the closest male-line relative to the current Imperial House, and has therefore figured in the Japanese succession debate as a possible pretender to the throne in case all four male members of the Imperial House die without issue. Hiroaki is also more immediately a third cousin once removed of the present Emperor, as both are descended from Prince Fushimi Kuniie, Naruhito's three-times great-grandfather through his grandmother the Empress Kojun, and Hiroaki's paternal great-great-grandfather.

He was born in Tokyo, and educated at the Gakushuin Peers School. His father, Prince Fushimi Hiroyoshi (1897–1938) was a naval commander in the Imperial Japanese Navy, and died shortly after the opening stages of the Second Sino-Japanese War in 1937. Prince Hiroaki, therefore, became the twenty-fourth head of the Fushimi-no-miya upon the death of grandfather, Prince Fushimi Hiroyasu, on 16 August 1946.

He was styled His Imperial Highness. With the abolition of the collateral branches of the Imperial household by the American occupation authorities after the end of the Pacific War, Prince Fushimi became a commoner, Hiroaki Fushimi on 14 October 1947. He later traveled to the United States and attended Centre College in Kentucky. He returned to Japan to pursue a career with Mobil Oil.

His late wife, the former Tokiko Yoshikawa, was the daughter of the president of Yoshikawa Optical Instruments. The couple have three daughters: Masako (born 1964), Nobuko (born 1961), and Akiko (born 1959). Although he does not have any sons, his adoptive grandnephew (probably a son of one of his sister's sons) has male issue who can be expected to become the head of the Fushimi-no-miya.

Ancestry

References

 Fujitani,T. Splendid Monarchy: Power and Pageantry in Modern Japan. University of California Press; Reprint edition (1998). 
Lebra, Sugiyama Takie. Above the Clouds: Status Culture of the Modern Japanese Nobility. University of California Press (1995). 

Japanese princes
Fushimi-no-miya
1932 births
Living people
Centre College alumni
People from Tokyo
ExxonMobil people